The A345 highway is a highway in Nigeria. It is one of the east-west roads linking the main south-north roads. (It is named from the two highways it links).

It runs from the A3 highway at Bauchi to the A4 highway at Biu,  Borno State. The city of Gombe the capital of Gombe State is on the road.
The city of Kumo, headquarters of Akko LGA, is also on the road.

References

 A345

Highways in Nigeria